Radonice is a municipality and village in Chomutov District in the Ústí nad Labem Region of the Czech Republic. It has about 1,200 inhabitants.

Administrative parts

Villages of Háj, Kadaňský Rohozec, Kojetín, Miřetice u Vintířova, Obrovice, Radechov, Sedlec u Radonic, Vintířov, Vlkaň, Vojnín and Ždov are administrative parts of Radonice.

Etymology
The name is derived from a personal name Radoň, meaning "the village of Radoň's people".

Geography
The central part of the municipal territory with the Radonice village lies in a tip of the Most Basin, the northern and southern parts lie in the Doupov Mountains. The Liboc River flows through the municipality.

History

The first written mention of Radonice is from 1196, when monks came from Waldsassen Abbey to a rule of Milhost from Mašťov. Ojíř of Radonice (Hogir de Radonitz) signed his donating document as a witness. 
              
Mikuláš and Jan Hasištejnský z Lobkovic were next holders. Fates of Radonice were connected with Vintířov with a knight fortress, which was changed to a castle for a noble family. After 1508, Radonice experienced the largest bloom. Opl of Fictum bought the Radonice's manor and Vintířov from Albrecht of Kolowrat. It was his merit that Radonice was raised to a town by King Vladislaus II in 1514. He conferred it a privilege of brewing beer, selling salt, markets arranging and the one-mile-law privilege.

In 1532, Albert Schlick bought the market town Radonice and Vintířov. The mastership of Schlicks lasted for three quarters of a century and it was a time of development. The town was enclosed by a wall and it had four gates. It had a brewery, a malt-house, two mills, a bath, a new pub and a town hospital.

In 1622, Ferdinand of Nagarol became a lord of the town. His wife forbade to receive Jews in the market town in 1628. In 1662, the king Leopold I ratified the privilege of the one-mile-law for a salt and a corn. In 1664 the Losynthal family bought the town. The first mention about school appeared in 1664. A new church was built on a place of the old one in 1702.

In 1842, stables and a riding school were destroyed by fire. In 1871 a sugar refinery grew up at the outskirts. In 1889, a new school was built in Doupovská street. From 1841 a regular connecting by a post coach started. First post office was opened in 1872. In 1884 a railway was built up. An electrification of the community was performed in 1910.

From the first half of 19th century coal mining developed. The best known coal mine was Františka and the exploitation ended on the eve of World War II. Soon after the beginning of World War II prisoners went to Radonice. 35 men from France were accommodated in the town. They worked mainly in the shafts and in local farms. The German population was expelled after World War II.

In 1952 the farmers' cooperation started, which stood on dried swamp. After the Velvet Revolution of 1989 the population is slowly increasing again.

Demographics

Notable people
Ignaz Walter (1755–1822), opera singer and composer
Bedřich Bernau (1849–1904), archaeologist and ethnographist, worked here

References

External links

Villages in Chomutov District